Philippe Col (born 14 June 1956) is a French former professional footballer. As a player, he was a initially a forward but was later converted to a full-back.

After football 
After his football career, Col was the manager of a real estate company in the Île-de-France region. He opted not to become a professional football manager like many other former players because he wished to lead a stable life in order for his children to succeed; he described coaching professional teams as a "mobile" occupation. Col henceforth settled in Rueil-Malmaison.

Honours 
Paris Saint-Germain
 Coupe de France: 1981–82, 1982–83

Saint-Quentin
 Coupe de Picardie: 1986–87

References

External links 
 
 

1956 births
Living people
Sportspeople from Suresnes
French footballers
French football managers
Association football fullbacks
Association football forwards
Association football player-managers
INF Vichy players
Red Star F.C. players
Paris Saint-Germain F.C. players
SC Toulon players
FC Sète 34 players
Olympique Saint-Quentin players
Ligue 2 players
Ligue 1 players
French Division 3 (1971–1993) players
Footballers from Hauts-de-Seine